Vitello is a lunar impact crater that lies along the southern edge of the small Mare Humorum, in the southwest part of the Moon's near side. It was named after 13th century Polish theologian and physicist Vitello. It lies just to the east of the lava-flooded crater Lee. To the northeast along the edge of the lunar mare is the Rupes Kelvin, an irregular fault line.

Description
This crater has a low, roughly circular rim with a sharp edge. The interior floor is irregular, rugged and hilly, with a ring of deep fractures surrounding the central peak. A low ridge projects out from the northwest rim into the mare.

Vitello was once believed to be a caldera rather than an impact crater.  In To A Rocky Moon, lunar geologist Don E. Wilhelms summarized: It  "is a Saari-Shorthill infrared hotspot, is fractured, and is blanketed and surrounded by a dark deposit.  If there is a caldera on the moon, this ought to be it."  However, Lunar Orbiter 5 acquired high-resolution images of the interior and geologists noted that the fractures were filled with boulders which caused the infrared anomaly, and so volcanic heat was not escaping from Vitello.  Wilhelms concluded "...if it is a caldera, its activity expired long ago."

Satellite craters
By convention these features are identified on lunar maps by placing the letter on the side of the crater midpoint that is closest to Vitello.

References

External links

 Lunar Orbiter 5 images of Vitello, including high-resolution frames of interior
  Includes high-resolution view of the interior of Vitello
 Includes high-resolution view of the interior of Vitello

Impact craters on the Moon